Henry Yanez (born August 28, 1957) is an American politician who served as a member of the Michigan House of Representatives for the 25th district from 2013 to 2019.

Early life and education 
Yanez was raised in Madison Heights, Michigan. He earned an Associate of Science degree in fire science and fire-fighting from Oakland Community College.

Career 
Yanez worked in that city as a firefighter and paramedic before his election to the state house. He previously ran unsuccessfully for the United States House of Representatives against Candice Miller in 2010.

Following his term limited time in the Michigan House of Representatives, Yanez was appointed to the Sterling Heights City Council to fill a vacant seat on January 15, 2019, by Mayor Mike Taylor. Yanez then ran in the 2019 general election and was elected to the seat for the full, two-year term.

Personal life 
Yanez lives in Sterling Heights.

References

External links
 State Representative Henry Yanez official site

1957 births
21st-century American politicians
Candidates in the 2022 United States House of Representatives elections
Hispanic and Latino American state legislators
Living people
Democratic Party members of the Michigan House of Representatives
People from Madison Heights, Michigan
People from Sterling Heights, Michigan